Jack Crabtree is a former American football quarterback who was the most valuable player of the 1958 Rose Bowl, despite the fact that his team lost the game.

Early life
Crabtree grew up in Lakewood, California and attended Excelsior High School in nearby Norwalk where he starred at quarterback. He attended San Bernardino Junior College before attending the University of Oregon and became the starting quarterback for the Oregon Ducks football team in his senior season of 1957.

Rose Bowl
In 1957, Crabtree led the Ducks to a tie for the Pacific Coast Conference championship with Oregon State. Since Oregon State had gone to the Rose Bowl the previous year, the unranked Ducks earned a berth in the 1958 Rose Bowl against heavily favored and top-ranked Ohio State. In the game, Crabtree completed 10 of 17 passes for 135 yards—huge numbers for those days—and the Ducks nearly pulled off a major upset, tying the game 7-7 in the second quarter and holding the score until the fourth quarter when a Buckeye field goal put Ohio State ahead for good, 10-7.

For his heroics in a losing effort, Crabtree was named Rose Bowl MVP, one of only two players from a losing Rose Bowl team to win the award outright. Crabtree was named to the Rose Bowl Hall of Fame in 1998.

Pro career and retirement
Crabtree was drafted in the 12th round of the 1958 NFL Draft by the Philadelphia Eagles before spending two years in the United States Army. In 1960, he played briefly with the Denver Broncos and Los Angeles Chargers of the American Football League. Following his retirement from football, he worked for the Champion sportswear company, becoming manager of its west coast sales force. He now lives in Eugene.

Legacy
Crabtree was named to the Oregon Sports Hall of Fame in 1981 and the University of Oregon Athletic Hall of Fame in 2002.

References 

People from Norwalk, California
Sportspeople from Eugene, Oregon
Sportspeople from Los Angeles County, California
Living people
American football quarterbacks
Philadelphia Eagles players
Los Angeles Chargers players
Denver Broncos (AFL) players
Oregon Ducks football players
Players of American football from California
San Bernardino Valley College alumni
1935 births